The Houghton County Traction Company Ahmeek Streetcar Station is a rail station located at the corner of US 41/M-26 and Hubbell Street in Ahmeek, Michigan. It was listed on the National Register of Historic Places in 2000.

Houghton County Traction Company 
The Houghton County Traction Company was started in 1900 as an interurban line in the Keweenaw Peninsula. The first section of track ran from Hancock to nearby Boston; in 1901, the line was extended to Calumet. During the next few years, a spur was built running to Lake Linden and Hubbell, and in 1908 the line was extended to just north of Mohawk.

The Houghton County Traction Company remained in business until 1932, in the depths of the Great Depression.

Station History 
The Ahmeek Station is one of the original trolley stops of the Houghton County Traction Company, which served Ahmeek and the surrounding location. The original stop in Ahmeek was a simple shelter. However, in 1909 the Allouez Mining Company leased land to the Houghton County Traction Company to construct a sub-station and waiting at this location. A building was constructed that year, but almost immediately outgrew its space. In 1910, the Traction Company constructed a small addition, which has since been removed. In 1931, Highway 41 was widened by the Michigan Department of Transportation, and the entire building was moved approximately 40 feet west to the other side of the railroad tracks.

After the rail line folded, the station was used for various purposes, including a bus stop and gas station. An ice cream window has been in place since the 1950s and in summer 2011, a local non-profit organization called Keweenaw Natural Areas opened a visitor center in what was the waiting room. The current owners also just finished renovating the entire original building, including the apartment upstairs that the original operators of the station lived in.

Description
The Houghton County Traction Company Ahmeek Streetcar Station is a rectangular wood-framed two-story building with a gabled roof and clapboard siding. A single story wing with two garage doors faces the highway. The front of the building has a pair of doors in the center and large windows are at each end of the first floor. Above are four 1/1 double hung windows. One of the first floor windows has a walk-up sliding window with a shed roof overhang. The rear of the building was originally the site of the train platform.

Inside, the first floor contains a large waiting room, now serving as a seating area for a restaurant, and a kitchen area one end along with restrooms. The main room is finished with headboard below a chair rail and has a tongue and groove headboard ceiling. The upstairs area was originally the stationmaster's apartment, and contains a kitchen, living room, two bedrooms, and a bathroom.

References

External links

Buildings and structures in Houghton County, Michigan
Railway stations on the National Register of Historic Places in Michigan
National Register of Historic Places in Houghton County, Michigan
Former railway stations in Michigan